Summit Lake is a lake in the James Bay drainage basin in the Unorganized North Part of Algoma District in northeastern Ontario, Canada. It is the source of the Kabinakagami River, which flows via the Kenogami River and Albany River to James Bay.

The Canadian Pacific Railway transcontinental main line (used at this point by the Via Rail Sudbury – White River train service) runs along the entire south shore; the lake lies between the railway points of Amyot to the west and Girdwood to the east.

See also
List of lakes in Ontario

References

Lakes of Algoma District